Edmund Morris (fl. 1410), of Kingsland, Herefordshire, was an English politician.

His son, John Morris, was also an MP.

He was a Member (MP) of the Parliament of England for Leominster in 1410.

References

14th-century births
15th-century deaths
English MPs 1410
People from Herefordshire